German submarine U-773 was a Type VIIC U-boat of Nazi Germany's Kriegsmarine during World War II.

She was ordered on 21 November 1940, and was laid down on 13 October 1942, at Kriegsmarinewerft, Wilhelmshaven, as yard number 156. She was launched on 8 December 1943, and commissioned under the command of Oberleutnant zur See Richard Lange on 20 January 1944.

Design
German Type VIIC submarines were preceded by the shorter Type VIIB submarines. U-773 had a displacement of  when at the surface and  while submerged. She had two shafts and two  propellers.

U-773 was fitted with five  torpedo tubes (four fitted at the bow and one at the stern), fourteen torpedoes or 26 TMA mines, one  SK C/35 naval gun, (220 rounds), one  Flak M42 and two twin  C/30 anti-aircraft guns. The boat had a complement of between 44 — 52 men.

Service history
U-773 participated in three war patrols that yielded no ships sunk or damaged.

On 9 May 1945, U-773 surrendered at Lofjord, near Trondheim, Norway. She was later transferred to Loch Ryan, Scotland on 29 May 1945. Of the 156 U-boats that eventually surrendered to the Allied forces at the end of the war, U-773 was one of 116 selected to take part in Operation Deadlight. U-773 was towed out and sank on 8 December 1945, by unknown causes.

References

Bibliography

External links

German Type VIIC submarines
U-boats commissioned in 1944
World War II submarines of Germany
Ships built in Wilhelmshaven
1943 ships
Maritime incidents in December 1945
World War II shipwrecks in the Atlantic Ocean
Operation Deadlight